Felipe Perrone Rocha (born 27 February 1986 in Rio de Janeiro) is a Spanish-Brazilian water polo player. He competed for Spain from 2003 until 2013, including in the 2008 Summer Olympics and 2012 Summer Olympics. Afterwards he competed for his birth country in the 2016 Summer Olympics, as Brazil earned its first qualifying spot in 32 years as hosts. He helped Spanish water polo club CN Atlètic-Barceloneta win the LEN Champions League in 2013–14 season. His brother Ricardo Perrone also competed for Spain in water polo.

Personal life 
While playing for Jug Dubrovnik, Perrone married Marija Pecotić from Brna on the island of Korčula.

Honours

Club

CN Barcelona
 LEN Euro Cup: 2003–04
Spanish Championship: 2003–04, 2004–05
Copa del Rey: 2002–03

CN Atlètic-Barceloneta
LEN Champions League: 2013–14
LEN Super Cup: 2014
Spanish Championship: 2005–06, 2006–07, 2008–09, 2009–10,  2012–13, 2013–14, 2014–15, 2017–18, 2018–19, 2019–20, 2020–21, 2021–22
Copa del Rey: 2005–06, 2006–07, 2008–09, 2009–10, 2012–13, 2013–14, 2014–15, 2017–18, 2018–19, 2019–20, 2020–21, 2021–22
Supercopa de España: 2006, 2007, 2009, 2010, 2013, 2015, 2018, 2019
Copa de Cataluña: 2006–07, 2008–09, 2009–10, 2012–13, 2013–14, 2014–15

Pro Recco
LEN Champions League: 2011–12 ; runners-up: 2010–11
LEN Super Cup: 2012
Serie A1: 2010–11, 2011–12
Coppa Italia: 2010–11
Adriatic League: 2011–12

Jug Dubrovnik
LEN Champions League: 2015–16 ; runners-up: 2016–17 
LEN Super Cup: 2016
Croatian Championship: 2015–16, 2016–17
Croatian Cup: 2015–16, 2016–17 
Adriatic League: 2015–16, 2016–17

Awards
Total-waterpolo magazine's man water polo "World Player of the Year" award: 2018
Member of the Second World Team of the Year's 2010–20  by total-waterpolo
Member of World Team 2018 by total-waterpolo
Olympic Games 2008 Team of the Tournament
Olympic Games 2012 Team of the Tournament
World League MVP: 2012 Almaty
Adriatic League MVP: 2015–16 with Jug Dubrovnik
Adriatic League Top Scorer: 2015–16 with Jug Dubrovnik
 LEN Champions League Top Scorer (2):  2012–13 with Atlètic-Barceloneta, 2016–17 with Jug Dubrovnik
LEN Champions Final Six MVP (2): 2015 with Atlètic-Barceloneta,  2016 with Jug Dubrovnik
Spanish Championship MVP (4): 2005–06  2009–10, 2012–13, 2020–21 with Atlètic-Barceloneta

See also
 Spain men's Olympic water polo team records and statistics
 List of men's Olympic water polo tournament top goalscorers
 List of World Aquatics Championships medalists in water polo

References

External links
 

1986 births
Living people
Brazilian male water polo players
Spanish male water polo players
Olympic water polo players of Spain
Olympic water polo players of Brazil
Water polo players at the 2008 Summer Olympics
Water polo players at the 2012 Summer Olympics
Water polo players at the 2016 Summer Olympics
Naturalised citizens of Spain
World Aquatics Championships medalists in water polo
Pan American Games silver medalists for Brazil
Mediterranean Games gold medalists for Spain
Mediterranean Games silver medalists for Spain
Competitors at the 2005 Mediterranean Games
Competitors at the 2009 Mediterranean Games
Pan American Games medalists in water polo
Water polo players at the 2015 Pan American Games
Mediterranean Games medalists in water polo
Medalists at the 2015 Pan American Games
Water polo players at the 2020 Summer Olympics
Water polo players from Rio de Janeiro (city)